Khalilabad County is in Razavi Khorasan province, Iran. The capital of the county is the city of Khalilabad. At the 2006 census, the county's population was 44,993 in 12,298 households. The following census in 2011 counted 49,111 people in 14,879 households. At the 2016 census, the county's population was 51,701 in 16,684 households.

Administrative divisions

The population history of Khalilabad County's administrative divisions over three consecutive censuses is shown in the following table. The latest census shows two districts, four rural districts, and two cities.

References

 

Counties of Razavi Khorasan Province